The 1994 British Speedway Championship was the 34th edition of the British Speedway Championship. The Final took place on 1 May at Brandon in Coventry, England. The Championship was won by Andy Smith, the second time in succession that he had won the title. Joe Screen won a run-off against Steve Schofield and Gary Havelock to finish second.

Final 
1 May 1994
 Brandon Stadium, Coventry

{| width=100%
|width=50% valign=top|

See also 
 British Speedway Championship
 1994 Individual Speedway World Championship

References 

British Speedway Championship
Great Britain